This is the complete discography of the rock band Wishbone Ash. Over the years they have released 24 studio albums, 12 live albums, 10 compilation albums and 20 singles.

Albums

Studio albums

Other albums

Live albums

Compilation albums

Singles

 Note: "No Easy Road" was rerecorded in 1973 for the "Wishbone Four" album. The original single, recorded in 1972, is a different version.

Tribute and cover albums

References

External links
Official discography of Wishbone Ash
Wishbone Ash discography. Independent, but not purposely leaving out anything.
 

Wishbone Ash
Rock music group discographies